MDD may refer to:

 Major depressive disorder, a mental disorder involving persistent low mood, low self-esteem and loss of interest. It is also known as clinical depression.
 Mate-Demate Device, a specialized crane used to piggyback the Space Shuttle onto an airplane
 Medical Devices Directive
 Midland Airpark (IATA: MDD), a public use airport in Midland, Texas
 Mine detection dogs
 Ministry of Defence (Italy), known natively as Ministero della Difesa
 Mirrored Drive Door, a case design for the Power Mac G4
 Model-driven development, a software engineering discipline